Paden City is a city in Tyler and Wetzel counties in the U.S. state of West Virginia, along the Ohio River. It was founded in 1902. The population was 2,550 at the 2020 census.

The town was named after Obediah Paden, a local pioneer.

Geography
Paden City is located at  (39.603571, -80.933683).

Demographics

2010 census
As of the census of 2010, there were 2,633 people, 1,143 households, and 775 families living in the city. The racial makeup of the city was 98.8% White, 0.2% African American, 0.2% Native American, 0.1% Asian, and 0.6% from two or more races. Hispanic or Latino of any race were 0.5% of the population.

There were 1,143 households, of which 26.0% had children under the age of 18 living with them, 52.1% were married couples living together, 11.5% had a female householder with no husband present, 4.2% had a male householder with no wife present, and 32.2% were non-families. 27.9% of all households were made up of individuals, and 15% had someone living alone who was 65 years of age or older. The average household size was 2.30 and the average family size was 2.76.

The median age in the city was 44.9 years. 20% of residents were under the age of 18; 7.2% were between the ages of 18 and 24; 22.8% were from 25 to 44; 28.1% were from 45 to 64; and 21.7% were 65 years of age or older. The gender makeup of the city was 47.7% male and 52.3% female.

2000 census
As of the census of 2000, there were 2,860 people, 1,183 households, and 843 families living in the city. The population density was 3,228.4 people per square mile (1,240.7/km2). There were 1,300 housing units at an average density of 1,467.5 per square mile (564.0/km2). The racial makeup of the city was 99.34% White, 0.10% African American, 0.10% Native American, 0.10% Asian, and 0.35% from two or more races. Hispanic or Latino of any race were 0.49% of the population.

There were 1,183 households, out of which 29.4% had children under the age of 18 living with them, 58.1% were married couples living together, 9.6% had a female householder with no husband present, and 28.7% were non-families. 26.0% of all households were made up of individuals, and 15.6% had someone living alone who was 65 years of age or older. The average household size was 2.40 and the average family size was 2.86.

In the city, the population was spread out, with 23.3% under the age of 18, 6.6% from 18 to 24, 26.2% from 25 to 44, 25.3% from 45 to 64, and 18.6% who were 65 years of age or older. The median age was 41 years. For every 100 females, there were 89.8 males. For every 100 females age 18 and over, there were 86.6 males.

The median income for a household in the city was $32,940, and the median income for a family was $38,510. Males had a median income of $37,460 versus $18,750 for females. The per capita income for the city was $19,498. About 12.8% of families and 15.1% of the population were below the poverty line, including 20.7% of those under age 18 and 13.4% of those age 65 or over.

Notable people
Jeff Casteel, Football player and coach, West Virginia Mountaineers 
Mark Funkhouser, former mayor of Kansas City, Missouri

See also
 List of cities and towns along the Ohio River
 Paden City High School

References

Cities in West Virginia
Cities in Tyler County, West Virginia
Cities in Wetzel County, West Virginia
West Virginia populated places on the Ohio River